Robert Farmer (born 21 March 1991) is a British ice hockey player for Whitley Warriors in the UK NIHL 1 and the British national team. Farmer previously played for Nottingham Panthers.

He represented Great Britain at the 2019 IIHF World Championship.

In July 2019, Farmer embarked on his second spell abroad by signing for Lausitzer Füchse of the DEL2 - reuniting with his former Nottingham head coach Corey Neilson and GB teammate Mike Hammond.

In 2021, Farmer agreed to join Whitley Warriors for the 2021-22 season.

References

External links

1991 births
Living people
Alaska Aces (ECHL) players
Braehead Clan players
British expatriate ice hockey people
English expatriate sportspeople in Canada
English expatriate sportspeople in the United States
Coventry Blaze players
English ice hockey forwards
Nottingham Panthers players
Sheffield Scimitars players
Lausitzer Füchse players
Whitley Warriors players
Sportspeople from Nottingham
Expatriate ice hockey players in Canada
Expatriate ice hockey players in the United States
Expatriate ice hockey players in Germany